Daffy Duck & Egghead is a 1938 Warner Bros. Merrie Melodies cartoon produced in 1937 and directed by Tex Avery. The cartoon was released on January 1, 1938, and stars Daffy Duck and Egghead.

Plot
Egghead (in a voice imitating radio comic Joe Penner), who is annoyed by a silhouetted man in the theater audience (Tedd Pierce) who refuses to sit down. After he sits down twice and finally gets shot by Egghead when he will not stay down, out comes Daffy Duck biting his nose. While fighting, a tortoise (imitating radio comic Parkyakarkus) comes and tries to give Daffy and Egghead new weapons. When the tortoise goes away, Egghead uses his real gun and Daffy tries to make him shoot the apple on his head. Egghead misses every time, so Daffy puts a blind sign, a cup of pencils, and disguise glasses on Egghead.  Daffy then sings a song (considered semi-obligatory for a Merrie Melodies cartoon at the time), and when he concludes, his own reflection in the water surfaces in three dimension and shakes his hand before they swim away together.

Later, Egghead finally manages to capture Daffy by shooting a pair of gloves from his gun, knocking Daffy out and allowing Egghead to place him in a net. Just as Egghead celebrates, a duck from the mental ward (seemingly his reflective doppelgänger from the earlier scene) comes to claim Daffy. He thanks Egghead for helping to catch Daffy, and tells him that Daffy is 100 percent nuts. "Yeah?", Egghead asks. "Yeah!", answers the duck warden. At that moment, both he and Daffy beat Egghead up before woohoo-ing out into the distance. Egghead becomes fed up with the antics and decides to join them as the cartoon ends.

Voice cast
Mel Blanc as Daffy Duck, Ambulance Duck, Turtle Referee, Egghead ("woo-hoo" sounds)
Danny Webb as Egghead
Tedd Pierce as Audience Member

Home media
VHS – Daffy!
VHS – The Golden Age of Looney Tunes - Vol. 2: Firsts
LaserDisc – The Golden Age of Looney Tunes - Vol. 1
DVD – Looney Tunes Golden Collection: Volume 3
DVD – The Essential Daffy Duck

Production notes
According to the copyright date in the cartoon's original opening title cards from 1937 and in the Blue Ribbon Merrie Melodies reissued opening title cards from 1946, this cartoon began production in 1937. But this was released in theaters on January 1, 1938.Daffy Duck & Egghead features the early, zany version of Daffy Duck, who spends the film harassing Egghead (making his second appearance in this cartoon as a hunter after making his first appearing Egghead Rides Again), and also marking the second appearance of Daffy Duck (after Porky's Duck Hunt), his first in color, and first where he is given his current name. It includes a set-piece song-and-dance number by Daffy, doing his own variation of "The Merry-Go-Round Broke Down" (which had recently become the theme for Looney Tunes).
Some scenes were reused from the previous Looney Tune cartoon Porky's Duck Hunt'', from Daffy nipping the hunter's nose, to his whooping and hollering as he bounced in and out of the water.
This cartoon was re-released into the Blue Ribbon Merrie Melodies program on April 20, 1946. The original opening, credits, and closing title cards were found and restored with the release of the third volume of the Looney Tunes Golden Collection in 2005. However, the audio used for the remastering of this short was taken from the European Turner "dubbed version", hence why the ending rendition of "Merrily We Roll Along" is incorrect.

Censorship
When the short was aired in the United States during the 1990s and 2000s on Cartoon Network, Boomerang and The WB, the scene in which Egghead kills the silhouetted audience member was cut.

See also
Looney Tunes and Merrie Melodies filmography (1929–1939)

References

External links

Daffy Duck & Egghead (Blue Ribbon) on the Internet Archive

Merrie Melodies short films
Films directed by Tex Avery
Daffy Duck films
Films about hunters
1938 animated films
1938 short films
1938 films
1930s Warner Bros. animated short films